Shatar (Mongolian:  Monggol sitar-a, "Mongolian shatranj"; a.k.a. shatar) and hiashatar are two chess variants played in Mongolia.

Game rules
The rules are similar to standard chess; the differences being that:
 The noyan (lord) does not castle.
 The küü (pawn) does not have an initial double-step move option, except for the queen pawn or king pawn. 
In old shatar rules, a pawn that reaches its eighth rank must promote to half-power tiger. But a pawn could step back to its sixth rank to promote to all-power tiger. It moves like a queen.
It was called half-power tiger or half-power lion in old shatar rules.
In modern shatar rules, a baras moves like a queen.
 The mori (knight) cannot deliver mate.
In modern shatar rules, the mori can give mate.
 The bishop (teme) and rook (terge) move as they do in standard chess.
 The game always starts by White playing 1.d4 and Black responding with 1...d5. This is the only time in the game a pawn may advance two squares; some sources claim this initial move can optionally be made with the e-pawn.
In old shatar rules, Ujimqin player must make an initial double-step move with the queen pawn; in Chahar, the king pawn.
In old shatar rules, baremate is draw.
In old shatar rules, one special rule is called tuuxəi, like komi in Go. A player could leave the enemy with only two pieces remaining (noyan and another piece) at the end. Then he must start making checks using the terge or baras and make consecutive checks until checkmate. Before checkmate, number of consecutive checks is the number of tuuxəi. If a player wins by checkmate as in chess, he receives only one tuuxəi. A player usually leaves the enemy with one noyan and one küü to allow time to put his pieces into good positions for making consecutive checks.

Hiashatar 

Hiashatar is a medieval chess variant played in Mongolia that is not as popular as shatar. The game is played on a 10×10 board. The pieces are the same as in shatar with the following exceptions:
 The baras moves the same as a chess queen.
 Pawns may move 1–3 step(s) on their first move.
 An additional piece called the bodyguard, which moves like a queen, but only one or two squares. The bodyguard has the special power: any piece sliding through any square a king's move away from the bodyguard, must stop its move. Any piece a king's move away from the bodyguard can move only one square.

Notes

References
 Giada Ricci. Mongolie-Mongolie. Traditions de la steppe. p. 44–47, Le jeu d’echecs Mongol, 1983. Musée de l’Homme, Paris.
 С. Кондратьев. Шахматная игра у монголов. "Шахматы в СССР", 1931, No.13, p. 216–18, No.14, с. 232–34.
 ШАХМАТЫ. Энциклопедический словарь. М., "Советская Энциклопедия", p. 258, Монголия. 1999.
 Б.Б. Цыденов, Л.А. Гармаева, Н.Б. Галданов. Шахматы в Бурятии. Улан-Удэ, 1976.
 Zhong Guo Da Bai Ke Quan Shu Tiyu (The Encyclopedia of Chinese People's Republic on Physical culture and Sports). Peking-Shanghai. p. 206, Mengu xiang qi (Mongolian chess). 1982.
 N. Okano, Sekai-no meina shogi (World's chess games), p. 40–46, chapter V. 1999.

Games related to chaturanga
Chess in Mongolia
Mongolian games